Nestegis cunninghamii, commonly called black maire is a native tree of New Zealand.

Nestegis cunninghamii grows to over 20 metres high, and has long, leathery leaves that have a recessed mid-rib. The tree has rough, cork-like bark, and produces red or yellow fruits.

Black maire is now found only in small areas of the North Island forest because of its high value as a hard timber and for firewood.

References

cunninghamii
Trees of New Zealand
Plants described in 1958